Imants Kokars (16 August 1921 in Gulbene, Latvia – 24 November 2011 in Riga, Latvia) was a Latvian pedagogue and conductor. His twin brother Gido Kokars was also a conductor. Imants Kokar has been chief conductor of several Latvian Song and Dance Festivals and initiated the Nordic-Baltic Choral Festival in 1995.

On 12 April 1995 Imants Kokars was awarded the Order of the Three Stars, third class.

References 

1921 births
2011 deaths
People from Gulbene
Latvian conductors (music)
Male conductors (music)
Soviet conductors (music)
Latvian twins
Academic staff of Jāzeps Vītols Latvian Academy of Music
People's Artists of the Latvian Soviet Socialist Republic
Recipients of the Cross of Recognition